Sydney Metro West is a rapid transit project under construction in Sydney, New South Wales, Australia, involving the construction of a rail line linking the Sydney City Centre (CBD) with Westmead in the outer western suburbs of Greater Sydney. The metro line will run parallel to the existing Main Suburban and Main Western railway lines, with the main aims being the doubling of rail capacity between the City Centre and Greater Western Sydney and the relief of overcrowding on the Western Line. The line will form part of the Sydney Metro network.

History 

The line was first mentioned in a discussion paper released in September 2016 that investigated new rail projects to service Western Sydney and the proposed Western Sydney Airport. Media reports indicated the project had found favour with Transport for NSW and the New South Wales Government.

The line was announced by the Baird government as an official project on 14 November 2016. Parramatta, Sydney Olympic Park, the Bays Precinct and the Sydney CBD were announced as initial station locations, with up to 12 stations being considered. The preferred alignment was scheduled to be announced in late 2018, while the line is expected to open in the second half of the 2020s. The government will use a value capture scheme to help pay for the project. The contributions from value capture are expected to amount to between 10 and 15 percent of the capital cost. Construction was originally planned to begin by 2022.

During the state election campaign in March 2019, the Liberal/National coalition government announced a funding of $6.4 billion to the project and commitment to start construction earlier in 2020, if re-elected. The Labor opposition also announced its commitment to fund the project if it won the election, at the expense of cancelling other announced transport and road projects such as the Western Harbour Tunnel & Beaches Link. The coalition government was subsequently re-elected in the election that month. In June 2019, the 2019-2020 New South Wales state budget reaffirmed the government's commitment and funding of $6.4 billion over four years to the project, with construction to be fast-tracked to start in 2020.

On 21 October 2019, the locations of seven stations were announced. Initial work is expected to start in 2020, with tunnelling to begin in 2022. The line is expected to open to the public by 2030.

Planning approval process of the project was done in stages due to the size of the project. In March 2021, planning approvals were granted to the project concept between Westmead and the CBD, and station excavation and tunnelling between Westmead and The Bays. Future planning stages will seek approval for major civil construction works including station excavation and tunnelling between The Bays and the CBD, tunnel fit-out, station building, and operation of the line between Westmead and the CBD.

Planning 

When the project was first announced, up to 12 stations including Parramatta, Sydney Olympic Park, the Bays Precinct and the Sydney central business district were announced as initial station locations. In March 2018, the government expanded the project scope, including:
an additional station at Westmead
a new station that will connect to existing stations either at Concord West or North Strathfield.
an interchange at the western end of the line, connecting with the existing railway stations at either Westmead or Parramatta

Other options for new metro stations include Camellia/Rydalmere, North Burwood/Five Dock, Kings Bay (Five Dock) and Pyrmont. Media reports indicate that Martin Place will be the main CBD interchange. During the state election campaign in March 2019, the government announced new stations at Five Dock, North Burwood and North Strathfield.

In October 2019, the locations of seven stations were announced:
Bays Precinct 
Five Dock
Burwood North
North Strathfield
Sydney Olympic Park
Parramatta
Westmead

At the time of announcement, the government was considering further stations at Pyrmont and Rydalmere. A stabling and maintenance facility and a service facility was also proposed to be built at Clyde, adjacent to the Auburn Maintenance Centre, and Silverwater respectively. The Clyde facility would be on the site of Sydney Speedway, which would be demolished, and would be accessed from the main tunnels via the former Carlingford railway line corridor. According to media reports, in 2019 the government decided to abandon plans for a second CBD station at Central Station, and plans for the line to run further to the south-east, with a station at Zetland.

On 30 April 2020, the project's Environmental Impact Statement (EIS) was released to the public for exhibition. The Rydalmere station option was confirmed scrapped due to the cost of extra  of tunneling and the increase in commuter travel times. Parramatta City Council has also urged the government to build a station at Camellia to trigger urban renewal of the precinct.

The Pyrmont station option was confirmed by the government on 11 December 2020. The station is likely to be close to The Star casino, and will likely involve an office and retail development above the station. The station location is subject to further planning and design work.

In May 2021, the station locations of Pyrmont and Hunter Street were announced.

Project description 

The line connects a number of suburbs in Sydney's inner west that lacked heavy rail transportation, including Pyrmont and Five Dock. 

There will be nine underground stations along the alignment:
Hunter Street (in the Sydney CBD)
Pyrmont
The Bays 
Five Dock
Burwood North
North Strathfield
Sydney Olympic Park
Parramatta
Westmead

Hunter Street will be the line's only CBD station, interchanging with other Sydney Metro and Sydney Trains services via pedestrian connections to Wynyard and Martin Place railway stations. The line will run via twin tunnels for its entire length. Like other Sydney Metro lines, Metro West will be fully automated and run similar rollingstock to the Sydney Metro North West Line, with a stabling and maintenance facility to be built at Clyde. Major commercial and residential developments are planned around several stations, including a new town centre at Sydney Olympic Park.

Construction began in 2020 with the line planned to open in 2030. The total cost of the project has not been released by the government, with 2021 reports in the Sydney Morning Herald suggesting a total price tag of $27 billion and a delayed opening date of 2033.

The project's western end serves a similar area to the Parramatta Light Rail, whose stage 1 alignment runs between Westmead and Carlingford. Stage 2 of the light rail project was initially deferred, then redesigned and truncated from Strathfield to Sydney Olympic Park via the suburbs to the north of the Parramatta River.

Possible extensions 
The government have announced they will safeguard the ability to extend the eastern section of the line to the south-east via Zetland and Green Square, and also allow for extending the western section beyond Westmead to areas such as the new Western Sydney Aerotropolis.

Construction

Early works and contracting 
The first major works that were contracted for the project by the state government were large tunnelling contracts, divided into three separate sections, with contracts to construct the underground stations and line-wide systems to follow. In August 2020, the government announced a shortlist of three consortia to deliver the project's first two major tunnelling packages:
John Holland, CPB Contractors and Ghella joint venture (JHCPBG JV)
Gamuda and Laing O’Rourke joint venture (GALC JV)
Acciona Australia and Ferrovial joint venture (AF JV)

The three consortia would first bid for the Central Tunnelling Package to build  of twin tunnels between The Bays and Sydney Olympic Park. The remaining two consortia who were not successful would then bid for the Western Tunnelling Package to build  of twin tunnels between Sydney Olympic Park and Westmead. 

Works began in The Bays area in November 2020 to prepare for the arrival of tunnel boring machines in 2022. This was later pushed back to 2023.

The contract for the Central Tunnelling Package was awarded to the Acciona Ferrovial joint venture in July 2021 at a cost of $1.96 billion. The contract for the Western Tunnelling Package was awarded to Gamuda and Laing O'Rourke joint venture in March 2022 at a cost of $2.16 billion.

Following planning approval in March 2021, work to prepare for tunnels and station excavation between Westmead and The Bays could begin. Tunnelling is expected to commence by the end of 2022. Media reports in 2021 suggested that difficulty in excavation and property acquisition in Sydney CBD for the Hunter Street station risked escalating costs on the project.

A third tunnelling contract for tunnelling between The Bays and Hunter Street (Eastern Tunnelling Package) was put out to tender in mid-2021. The package included  of twin tunnels, two tunnel boring machines launched from a site in The Bays, a train turn-back cavern east of Hunter Street station, excavation and civil works on two stations, and tunnel lining segments. The shortlist for the package was announced in February 2022:
Acciona and Ferrovial Construction joint venture (AF JV)
Bouygues, Vinci and Soletanche Bachy joint venture (BV JV)
John Holland, CPB Contractors and Ghella Pty Ltd joint venture (JCG JV)
In November 2022, the Eastern Tunnelling Package was awarded to the John Holland, CPB Contractors and Ghella joint venture at a cost of $1.63 billion.

The contracting for line-wide systems and design, trains and signalling, stations, integrated station developments, and operations and maintenance are to be awarded separately from the main tunnelling contracts and are expected to be awarded in 2023. Underground stations are to be delivered for The Bays, Five Dock, Burwood North, North Strathfield and Westmead as part of a Stations Package West contract, while the remaining stations will be delivered individually as part of integrated station developments.

Major construction and tunnelling 
Early works to prepare for tunnelling commenced in 2020 with tunnelling on the central and western sections of the line expected to begin in 2023.

In January 2023 it was announced that the emergency exits in tunnels on the Metro West and Metro Western Sydney Airport lines will be spaced at  where possible, matching the existing lines.

Past proposals 

In the 2000s, there were two previous proposals to link Sydney CBD to Western Sydney via a new alignment. The first of these was the Western Fast Rail which was proposed by a private consortium, linking Wynyard and Penrith stations. The second proposal was the West Metro, first announced by Premier Morris Iemma in 2008 as a possible future route in the Metro Link proposal. The proposal was carried forward to the Sydney Metro project announced by Iemma's successor Nathan Rees in 2009. It is important to note that the Sydney Metro project is a different and separate project to the current Sydney Metro, which was first proposed by the new Liberal government in 2011.

Western FastRail 

Western FastRail was a proposed $2 billion privately funded underground and above-ground train line that would link central Sydney with Western Sydney independent from the CityRail network. Western FastRail was being backed by a consortium led by businessman and former union leader Michael Easson, which includes Dutch bank ABN AMRO and Australian construction company Leighton Holdings. The project was prompted by congestion on Sydney's westbound trains and roads, the growing importance of Parramatta as a business centre, higher petrol prices, public opposition to tolled roads and environmental concerns. An unreleased government document leaked to The Daily Telegraph suggests that such a train would eliminate the need of around 18 million car trips per year, reducing between 34,000 and 45,000 tonnes of greenhouse gas emissions being put into the atmosphere.

The proposal was first made on 11 April 2002 when Col Gellatly, the state's top civil servant and director-general of the Department of Premier convened a meeting of Treasury secretary, John Pierce, the Transport NSW director-general, Michael Deegan, and the State Rail Authority chief executive, Howard Lacy. Before them consortium leader Michael Easson made a presentation for a privately financed rail line linking Sydney's far west with the city. For a $8 return toll on top of the normal fare, trains travelling at 160 km/h could carry up to 16,000 commuters an hour to the city in 28 minutes, taking 11 minutes from Parramatta to the city. The proposal depended on the construction of two tracks from St Marys to Penrith, as well as taking over existing CityRail tracks between St Marys to Westmead. Costed at $2 billion, it was deemed extraordinarily cheap, and in December 2003 the Government formally rejected the unsolicited proposal.

In March 2005, the proposal was again brought up, and again in December 2006 by then federal Opposition Leader Kevin Rudd during a visit to Penrith should the Australian Labor Party win the 2007 Federal Election. The plan received approving comments by the NSW State Government. In September 2007 the proposal was again shown to the NSW Government. Under the proposal, the project is proposed to be funded by the private sector, with Fastrail's assets being returned to the NSW Government after 30 years.

On 18 March 2008, the NSW State Government announced SydneyLink, which included plans for the West Metro. Premier Morris Iemma was asked about the Western FastRail proposal, and said that "the proposal on Penrith has got to stack up," and "the work that has been done shows that it does not stack up, for a number of reasons." On 25 August, the State Government made a public announcement that it had ruled out the project two weeks earlier due to cost concerns, with the head of the consortium saying that the Government has failed to adequately review the proposal.

Proposed Alignment 
The line would continue above-ground to Blacktown in six minutes, and onwards to Penrith in a further eleven minutes. At the time, journeys on existing CityRail lines take up to three times as long.

There were 10 stations proposed for the Western FastRail:
 Wynyard
Metro West (new station)
 Central
 Olympic Park (possible new station)
 Parramatta
 Seven Hills
 Blacktown
 Mount Druitt
 St Marys
 Penrith

West Metro 

The SydneyLink project was a massive infrastructure scheme announced by the state government led by premier Morris Iemma on 18 March 2008. The centrepiece of the scheme was "Metro Link", a future rapid transit system of underground, privately operated, single-deck, automated trains. One of the possible future metro lines was the West Metro, from the Sydney CBD to Parramatta and Westmead. After Nathan Rees replaced Iemma later that year, the West Metro was incorporated into Rees's Sydney Metro project, announced in 2009. The West Metro would be the second stage 2 of the project, and would extend CBD Metro (stage 1 - Central to Rozelle) from Central westward to Olympic Park. Stage 5 of the project would further extend the line westward from Olympic Park to Parramatta, planned for completion in 2024.

Rees' Sydney Metro project was cancelled in February 2010 by the government led by newly appointed premier Kristina Keneally. Keneally said "We've listened to the community and made a tough decision," and pledging to reimburse tenderers and property owners for losses incurred as a result of the work that had occurred to that point. Keneally announced a $50 billion transport plan to replace the metro project, including a new heavy rail line under the CBD. Legislation to remove references to the Sydney Metro Authority was enacted later that year. Keneally's alternative was the CBD Relief Line, which would be heavy-rail bypass of the existing city-centre stations. Keneally lost office just over a year later in the 2011 New South Wales state election, and the relief line was cancelled by the incoming government led by premier Barry O'Farrell.

Criticism 
The metro line will pass through several suburbs that will not be serviced by the line. These include Rozelle, Leichhardt, Silverwater and Rosehill. With the Carlingford railway line having closed in 2020, this means none of these suburbs will be serviced by either metro or heavy rail once the metro is completed.

References

External links 
Sydney Metro West project overview
Western FastRail - Archived July 2008

Proposed railway lines in Australia
Railway lines in Sydney
Sydney Metro
2030 in rail transport